John McCullough is the name of:

 John McCullough (actor) (1837–1885), American actor
 John McCullough (rugby union) (born 1936), New Zealand rugby football player
 John Alexander McCullough (1860-1947), New Zealand politician
 John C. McCullough (1858-1920), American politician from California
 John G. McCullough (1835–1915), American politician and governor of Vermont
 John McCullough (basketball) (born 1956), American basketball player and coach

See also
John McCulloch (disambiguation)